Slak may refer to:

Franci Slak (1953–2007), Slovenian film director
Lojze Slak (1932–2011), Slovenian musician